The Geological Survey of Canada (GSC) is a Canadian federal government agency responsible for performing geological surveys of the country developing Canada's natural resources and protecting the environment. A branch of the Earth Sciences Sector of Natural Resources Canada, the GSC is the country's oldest scientific agency and was one of its first government organizations.

History

In September 1841, the Province of Canada legislature passed a resolution that authorized the sum of £1,500 sterling be granted to the government for the estimated expense of performing a geological survey of the province. In 1842, the Geological Survey of Canada was formed to fulfill this request.

William Edmond Logan was in Montreal at the time and made it known that he was interested in participating in this survey. Gaining recommendations from prominent British scientists, Logan was appointed the first GSC director on April 14, 1842. Four months later, Logan arrived in Kingston, Ontario, to compile the existing body of knowledge of Canada's geology. In the spring of 1843, Logan established the GSC's headquarters in Montreal (in his brother's warehouse and then in a rented house on Great St. James Street (now Saint Jacques Street). One of the prominent cartographers and the chief topographical draughtsman was Robert Barlow, who began his work in 1855. Chemist T. Sterry Hunt joined in the early days and the Survey added paleontological capability in 1856 with the arrival of Elkanah Billings.  After Aylesworth Perry was appointed as acting librarian in 1881 he prepared the catalogue of reference works on geology, mineralogy, metallurgy, chemistry and natural history. George Mercer Dawson became a staff member in 1875, progressed to assistant director in 1883 and finally to director of the Geological Survey of Canada in 1895.
The Geological Survey of Canada first began allowing women to conduct fieldwork in the early 1950s. Dr. Alice Wilson, the first of these women, lobbied for the inclusion of paleontologist Frances Wagner shortly afterward. Around this same time, the GSC employed a third woman Dr. Helen Belyea.

Programs and activities

Seismograph Network
The Canadian National Seismograph Network is monitored by the Geological Survey of Canada.

Geomagnetic monitoring
The Geological Survey Canada operates a network of 14 magnetic observatories throughout Canada, located as follows:

 Nunavut: Alert, Baker Lake, Cambridge Bay, Eureka, Iqaluit, Resolute Bay, Sanikiluaq
 Northwest Territories: Yellowknife
 British Columbia: Victoria
 Alberta: Meanook
 Manitoba: Brandon, Churchill
 Ontario: Ottawa
 Newfoundland and Labrador: St. John's

See also
Geology of Canada
Former Geological Survey of Canada Building

References
Notes

Bibliography

External links
 Life of a Rock Star 
1935 Dr. Alfred Jolliffe, Geological Survey of Canada  NWT Historical Timeline, Prince of Wales Northern Heritage Centre
 Sir William E. Logan and the Geological Survey of Canada, including Logan's journals, scrapbook and photographs
The Papers of Robert Bell at Dartmouth College Library

 
Federal departments and agencies of Canada
Natural Resources Canada
1842 establishments in Canada
Scientific organizations based in Canada
National geological agencies
Province of Canada
 
Geological surveys